Z(4430) is a mesonic resonance discovered by the Belle experiment. The resonant nature of the peak has been confirmed by the LHCb experiment with a significance of at least 13.9 σ. It has the spin-parity quantum numbers JP = 1+.

The particle joins the X(3872), Zc(3900) and Y(4140) as exotic hadron candidates observed by multiple experiments, although it is the first to be confirmed as a resonance.

See also
 XYZ particle

References

External links 
 Major harvest of four-leaf clover

Mesons
2014 in science
Subatomic particles with spin 1